Thomas Eric Evans KCVO (1 February 1928 – 17 August 1996) was Dean of St Paul's from 1988 until his death eight years later.

Biography
Evans was educated at St Catharine's College, Cambridge, ordained in 1954  and began his ordained ministry with curacies in Margate and  Bournemouth. After this, he was youth chaplain for the Diocese of Gloucester and then the Archdeacon of Cheltenham.

Evans was an opponent of the ordination of women.

References

1928 births
Alumni of St Catharine's College, Cambridge
Archdeacons of Cheltenham
Deans of St Paul's
Knights Commander of the Royal Victorian Order
1996 deaths